Bodenfelde is a municipality in the district of Northeim, in Lower Saxony, Germany. It is situated on the right bank of the Weser, approx. 35 km north of Kassel, and 30 km northwest of Göttingen at the southwest border of the Solling-Vogler Nature Park.

History
Bodenfelde was first mentioned in a document signed by Louis the Pious in 833. In the High Middle Ages Bodenfelde was a part of the county of Dassel. Amelith, Nienover, Polier and Wahmbeck are villages nearby Bodenfelde which were incorporated in 1974.

There used to be a Jewish community in Bodenfelde.  with the impending oppression of the Nazi regime, they left. Having been sold to a farmer in 1937, the wooden synagogue from 1825 survived Kristallnacht when the owner defended it from vandals.  In the early twenty-first century, the half-timbered building was dismantled and exactly re-constructed in nearby Goettingen, which had a Jewish community in need of a synagogue (the local one having been destroyed during Kristallnacht.

In 2008 the murderer nicknamed the Black Widow was convicted.  Over a period of two decades, she had seduced and killed  or had killed four elderly men for their money.

Notable Person
Jacob Freudenthal

References

 Herbst, Detlev, Jüdisches Leben im Solling – Der Synagogenverband Bodenfelde-Uslar-Lippoldsberg und die Synagogengemeinschaft Lauenförde. Uslar 1997
 Hoffmann, Lutz et al., Zwischen Feld und Fabrik: Arbeiteralltag auf dem Dorf von der Jahrhundertwende bis heute; die Sozialgeschichte des Chemiewerkes Bodenfelde 1896 bis 1986. Verlag Die Werkstatt, Göttingen 1986
 Junge, Walter, Chronik des Fleckens Bodenfelde – Von den Anfängen bis zur Gegenwart. Bodenfelde 1983
 Junge, Walter  and Thomas Thiele, Flecken Bodenfelde mit seinen Ortschaften Bodenfelde, Nienhover und Wahmbeck – Vorgestern, gestern und heute. Geiger, Horb am Neckar 1987
 Rock, Balzer, Die Ortsgeschichte von Bodenfelde. Buchdruckerei Klapproth, Uslar 1940

Northeim (district)
Holocaust locations in Germany